Dilara Buse Günaydın (born July 5, 1989 in Gölcük, Kocaeli Province, Turkey) is a Turkish swimmer competing in the breaststroke events.
 transferred to Galatasaray Swimming from Fenerbahçe Swimming.

She graduated from Journalism Department at the Faculty of Communications from Istanbul University.

Günaydın is holder of the national record in 50 m breastroke with 31.63 set at the 2009 European Short Course Swimming Championships in Istanbul, Turkey.

She represented her country in the 100 m and 200 m breaststroke events at the Summer Olympics in Beijing, China without advancing to the finals. Günaydın qualified to participate in the 100 m breaststroke event at the 2012 Summer Olympics by setting a new national record with 1.09.27.  At the 2012 Summer Olympics, she competed in the 100 and 200 m breaststroke.

Günaydın improved her own national record to 31.23 in the semifinals of 50 m breaststroke event at the 2012 European Short Course Swimming Championships held in Chartres, France, where she ranked 8th in the finals.

At the 2013 Mediterranean Games held in Mersin, Turkey, she won one silver and two bronze medals.

Achievements

See also
 Turkish women in sports

References

1989 births
Istanbul University alumni
Turkish female breaststroke swimmers
Turkish female swimmers
Fenerbahçe swimmers
Galatasaray Swimming swimmers
Olympic swimmers of Turkey
Swimmers at the 2008 Summer Olympics
Living people
People from Gölcük
Swimmers at the 2012 Summer Olympics
Mediterranean Games silver medalists for Turkey
Mediterranean Games bronze medalists for Turkey
Swimmers at the 2013 Mediterranean Games
Mediterranean Games medalists in swimming